What's My Name? or What's My Name may refer to:

 "What's My Name" (China Anne McClain, Thomas Doherty and Dylan Playfair song)
 "What's My Name?" (Rihanna song)
 "What's My Name?" (Snoop Doggy Dogg song)
 "What's My Name?" (DMX song)
 "What's My Name" (The Clash song), a 1977 song by The Clash from The Clash
 What's My Name? (Miyavi album)
 What's My Name? (radio program), American radio program
 What's My Name, a 1987 album by Steady B
 What's My Name (Ringo Starr album), 2019
 "What's My Name", a 2005 song by Chris Brown from Chris Brown
 What's My Name? (EP), 2017, by Korean group T-ara
 An alternative name for the 1967 boxing match Muhammad Ali vs. Ernie Terrell, from a taunt Ali repeated during the fight